Ancylastrum is a genus of air-breathing freshwater limpets, aquatic pulmonate gastropod mollusks in the family Planorbidae, the ram's horn snails and their allies.

Species
The genus Ancylastrum includes the following species:
 Ancylastrum cumingianus (Bourguignat, 1853) - Australian freshwater limpet
Species inquirenda
 Ancylastrum dextrorsum Clessin, 1907 
 Ancylastrum issykulense Clessin, 1907
 Ancylastrum ovatum Clessin, 1907 
 Ancylastrum turkestanicum Clessin, 1907

References

Acroloxidae
Taxonomy articles created by Polbot